The 1949 National Amateur Cup in soccer featured 145 entrants (71 eastern and 74 western). Elizabeth of New Jersey won their first national title by defeating the Zenthoefer Furs of St. Louis by a score of 6-1 in the final.

Eastern Division

Western Division

Final

See also
1949 National Challenge Cup

Ama
National Amateur Cup